A number of popular and commercially important food plants are native to the Americas. Some are endemic, meaning they occur naturally only in the Americas and nowhere else, while others occur naturally both in the Americas and on other continents as well.

When complete, the list below will include all food plants native to the Americas (genera marked with a dagger † are endemic), regardless of when or where they were first used as a food source. For a list of food plants and other crops which were only introduced to Old World cultures as a result of the Columbian Exchange touched off by the arrival of Christopher Columbus in 1492, see New World crops.

Grains

Corn/Maize  (Zea†)
Quinoa (Chenopodium)
Several (though not all) species of amaranth (Amaranthus)
Some species of wild rice (Zizania)
Indian Corn (Flint Corn)

Legumes
Peanut (Arachis†})
Pinto, black, kidney, navy, scarlet runner (https://hort.extension.wisc.edu/articles/scarlet-runner-bean-phaseolus-coccineus/ })(Phaseolus coccineus) and lima beans (Phaseolus†)

Nightshades

Potato (Solanum)
Tomato (Solanum)
Bell and chili peppers (Capsicum†)
Tomatillo (Physalis philadelphica)

Fruits

Pineapple (Ananas†)
Guava (Psidium† and Acca†)
Passion fruit (Passiflora)
Papaya (Carica† and Vasconcellea†)
Cherimoya, sugar-apple, hog plum, and soursop (Annona)
Pawpaw (Asimina†)
Dragonfruit/pitaya (Hylocereus† and Stenocereus†)
Concord grape (Vitis)
Huckleberry (Vaccinium and Gaylussacia†)
Several (though not all) species of:
Strawberry (Fragaria)
Blueberry (Vaccinium)
Cranberry (Vaccinium)
Raspberry (Rubus)
Salmonberry(Rubus)
Oregon grape(Mahonia)
Thimbleberry(Rubus)
Mayhaw(Crataegus)
Blackberry (Rubus)
Plum (Prunus)
Black cherry (Prunus)
 Chokecherry (Prunus virginiana)
Hawthorn Berry (Crataegus)
Staghorn Sumac (Rhus typhina)
Prickly Pear or Cactus Pear (Opuntia ficus-indica)

Nuts

Peanut (Arachis†) commarode Peanuts 
Cashew (Anacardium†)
Chestnut
Pecan (Carya)
Black walnut (Juglans)
Brazil nut (Bertholletia†)
Butternut or White Walnut (Juglans cinerea)
Many species of Acorns - seeds of the genus Quercus Oak

Other

Cocoa (Theobroma†)
Vanilla (Vanilla)
Cassava (Manihot†)
Sweet potato (Ipomoea)
Jicama (Pachyrhizus†)
Jerusalem artichoke and sunflower (Helianthus†)
Avocado (Persea)
Agave (Agave†)
Pumpkin and squash (Cucurbita†)
Chayote (Sechium†)
Chia (Salvia)
Maple Syrup
Honey (Melipona, Apis nearctica) 
Al-Muzen-Cab, Mayan god of honey
Yaupon (Ilex vomitoria)

See also
Columbian Exchange
List of food origins
New World crops

References

Food,Americas
plants